This is a list of fatal shark attacks in Australia. The Australian Shark-Incident Database has recorded that between 1791 and April 2018 there were 237 fatal shark attacks in Australia.
In the two years of 2020 and 2021 there were 11 fatal shark attacks in Australia.

New South Wales

Northern Territory

Queensland 
 Includes Torres Strait

South Australia

Tasmania

Victoria

Western Australia

See also
 List of fatal, unprovoked shark attacks in the United States
 List of fatal shark attacks in California
 List of shark attacks in South Africa
List of fatal shark attacks in South Africa
 Western Australian shark cull

References

 
 
 
 

Footnotes

External links 
 

Deaths due to shark attacks
Accidental deaths in Australia
Fatal shark attacks
Shark attacks in Australia
Lists of deaths due to animal attacks in Australia